Shakespeare Wallah is a 1965 Merchant Ivory Productions film. The story and screenplay are by Ruth Prawer Jhabvala, about a travelling family theatre troupe of English actors in India, who perform Shakespeare plays in towns across India, amidst a dwindling demand for their work and the rise of Bollywood. Madhur Jaffrey won the Silver Bear for Best Actress at the 15th Berlin International Film Festival for her performance. The music was composed by Satyajit Ray.

Plot
Loosely based on the real-life actor-manager Geoffrey Kendal's family and his travelling "Shakespeareana Company", which earned him the Indian sobriquet "Shakespearewallah", the film follows the story of nomadic British actors as they perform Shakespeare plays in towns in post-colonial India. In this story, Tony Buckingham (Geoffrey Kendal) and his wife Carla (Laura Liddell) oversee the troupe. Their daughter, Lizzie Buckingham (Felicity Kendal), falls in love with Sanju (Shashi Kapoor), who is also romancing Manjula (Madhur Jaffrey), a Bollywood film star.

In real life, Shashi Kapoor fell in love with Felicity's elder sister Jennifer Kendal. Their marriage provided an important contribution to the Indian film industry until Kendal's death in 1984.

Cast
 Shashi Kapoor as Sanju
 Felicity Kendal as Lizzie Buckingham
 Geoffrey Kendal as Tony Buckingham
 Laura Liddell as Carla Buckingham
 Madhur Jaffrey as Manjula
 Utpal Dutt as Maharaja
 Praveen Paul as Didi
 Prayag Raj as Sharmaji (as Prayag Raaj)
 Pinchoo Kapoor as Guptaji
 Jim D. Tytler as Bobby (as Jim Tytler)
 Hamid Sayani as Headmaster's Brother
 Marcus Murch as Dandy in 'The Critic'
 Partap Sharma as Aslam
 Jennifer Kendal as Mrs Bowen (uncredited)
 Ismail Merchant as Theater Owner (uncredited)

Production
After the success of the first film, The Householder (1963), the team of Ivory and Merchant reunited with screenwriter Ruth Prawer Jhabvala and  actor Shashi Kapoor for this film. Due to budget constraints, the film was shot in black and white, and the Kendal family play their own fictionalized counterparts, the Buckinghams.

Reception

The film holds a score of 89%, based on 9 critics, on Rotten Tomatoes.

Home media
It was released on DVD from Odyssey, as well as in a boxset as part of the Merchant Ivory Collection of the Merchant Ivory Productions.

References

External links
 Shakespeare Wallah at the British Film Institute
 
 Merchant Ivory overview

Further reading
 

1965 films
1965 drama films
Films about Indian Americans
English-language Indian films
Films about theatre
Merchant Ivory Productions films
Films directed by James Ivory
Films with screenplays by Ruth Prawer Jhabvala
American films based on actual events
Indian films based on actual events
Films set in India
American black-and-white films
Indian black-and-white films
Films set in the 1950s
Films set in Lucknow
Asian-American drama films
Films with screenplays by James Ivory
Films shot in Lucknow
1960s English-language films
1960s American films
1960s Indian films